Laxminarayan Institute of Technology (abbreviated LIT or LIT Nagpur) is a government institute of higher education in the field of Chemical Engineering in Nagpur, India. It was established in 1942 and is one of the oldest engineering colleges for Chemical Engineering and Technology in India. Similar to the other institutes of technology in India, LIT offers courses after the 10+2 level (Bachelors: BTech) and postgraduate courses like MTech and PhD

History
The Laxminarayan Institute of Technology is one of the premier and the only engineering college directly managed by the Nagpur University. The land, donated by Rao Bahadur D. Laxminarayan, houses both the Nagpur University and the Institute. The Laxminarayan Institute of Technology was founded in 1942 by Laxminarayan of Kamptee. His work brought him into contact with complex problems that required the aid of technologists. He believed the lack of qualified thinkers should not stand in the way of progress, so he donated the main part of his property, then estimated at ₹ 3,520,540 to the Nagpur University in his will dated 3 May 1930, for "Teaching of Applied Science and Chemistry". Subsequently, a committee was appointed by Nagpur University on 6 February 1932, known as the "Bequest Scheme Committee", that consisted of notable men from the fields of science, industry, and public affairs throughout India. The committee recommended establishing an Institute of Technology to teach industrial chemistry with particular emphasis on the application of science to the industrial development of the province, then known as the Central Provinces and Berar.

In 1934, the scheme was prepared for starting a two-year BSc (Tech) course. The present site for the Institute was selected in the year 1936 by Harisingh Gour. In 1937, the University appointed Ram Simha Thakur as the officer-on-special duty to oversee the construction of the Institute.

The Institute started functioning with admissions into a two-year BSc (Tech) program in Chemical Engineering, Chemical Technology, and Oil Technology on 1 August 1942 with S.A. Saletore, Professor of Organic Chemistry (Applied) as Director-in-Charge. It was officially inaugurated on 9 January 1943 by N.R. Sirkar.

The development from 1942 to 1947 was not very noteworthy because of World War II. However, the students' numbers increased to 34, and 11 members of the staff were appointed.

On 28 July 1945, the Executive Committee of the Nagpur University appointed R. B. Forster, the then-Head of the Department of Chemical Technology at the University of Bombay as Director of the Institute. Ing. H. G. Kayser took over as the Director in 1950, succeeded by P. S. Mene in 1951. The number of admissions increased to 36 and the four-year degree course started in 1951. The courses of study were revised to provide for more intensive specializations.

In 1959, the Ministry of Education recommended a recurring grant for the building and equipment. The AICTE (All India Council for Technical Education) decided to increase the intake of engineering graduates in all institutions and recommended that the Laxminarayan Institute of Technology should admit 60 students instead of 36 and start a 5 Year Integrated Course in Chemical Engineering. In 1969, the University Grants Commission (UGC) gave an additional grant for starting a three-year BSc (Tech) course in Oil Technology. The Institute took in sixty students to start the Five Year Integrated Course in 1967. During these years, the post-graduate degrees of Nagpur University in the field of Technology were awarded on the basis of a research thesis. The MTech courses (Petro-Chemical Technology, Oil Technology, Paint Technology, and Chemical Engineering) began in 1967 and were pursued more in 1969.

The institute introduced two new courses in 1971: three-year programs in Food and Petro-chemical Technology. In 1976, a BSc Technology. course in Cellulose Technology was introduced.

In response to the new educational pattern of 10+2, the Institute introduced a Four Year BTech (Chemical Engineering) course and the first set of students were admitted in 1977. In 1994, the Institute discontinued its BSc.Tech. course and replaced it with a new BTech course in Chemical Technology with a specialization in Petrochemical Technology, Food Technology, Pulp & Paper Technology, Oil Technology, and Plastic & Polymer Technology. Presently, the Institute offers a Four Year BTech (Chemical Engineering) program, Four Year BTech program in Chemical Technology with areas of specialization such as Petrochemical Technology, Food Technology, Pulp & Paper Technology, Oil Technology, Plastic & Polymer Technology, and Surface Coating Technology.

In 2018-2019 LIT admitted all prospective students, compared to the 45% placement nationwide average for the same period.

Admissions
Admissions to the undergraduate course are done through the Maharashtra Health and Technical Common Entrance Test. The Institute offers programs through seven disciplines.
 Chemical Engineering
 Food Technology
 Petroleum Refining and Petrochemicals Technology
 Surface-coating Technology
 Paper and Pulp Technology
 Oils, Fats and Surfactants Technology
 Plastics and Polymers Technology

Rankings

The institute was ranked no. 46 in Mint C-Fore Top Government Engineering College Rankings in 2008 and has consistently found its place among the top fifty engineering colleges in India in leading education surveys.
The National Institutional Ranking Framework (NIRF) ranked it 136th among engineering colleges in 2021.

Accreditations 
The institute has been accredited with A+ grade by the National Assessment and Accreditation Council (NAAC) for 5 years having scored a CGPA of 3.48 on a seven point scale on 23 August 2022.

Notable alumni
 Harish Bhimani, voiceover artiste and anchor
 Suresh Kashinath Haware, nuclear scientist and politician
 B. D. Kulkarni, chemical reaction engineer
 G. S. Laddha, chemical engineer

Infrastructure
Institute has a campus of about  located at Amravati Road in the western part of the city and houses all the departments of the Institute.

See also
 Nagpur
 Nagpur University
 List of educational institutions in Nagpur

References

External links
Official site - Laxminarayan Institute of Technology
 Official Alumni Network - Laxminarayan Institute of Technology

1942 establishments in India
Educational institutions established in 1942
Engineering colleges in Nagpur
Rashtrasant Tukadoji Maharaj Nagpur University